Fairlawn is a city in western Summit County, Ohio, United States, and a suburb of Akron. The population was 
7,710 at the 2020 census. It is part of the Akron metropolitan area.

Geography

Fairlawn is located at  (41.129555, -81.618103).

History 
Fairlawn was incorporated as Fairlawn Village in 1960. It became a city when its population reached 6,200 in the 1970 census. (Fairlawn, 2003)

Demographics

2010 census
As of the census of 2010, there were 7,437 people, 3,219 households, and 1,978 families living in the city. The racial makeup of the city was 82.1% White, 11.0% African American, 4.3% Asian, 0.5% from other races, and 2.0% from two or more races. Hispanic or Latino of any race were 2.3% of the population.

There were 3,219 households, of which 25.1% had children under the age of 18 living with them, 46.8% were married couples living together, 10.6% had a female householder with no husband present, 4.0% had a male householder with no wife present, and 38.6% were non-families. 34.2% of all households were made up of individuals, and 16.7% had someone living alone who was 65 years of age or older. The average household size was 2.20 and the average family size was 2.82.

The median age in the city was 46.8 years. 19.4% of residents were under the age of 18; 5.7% were between the ages of 18 and 24; 22.3% were from 25 to 44; 29.2% were from 45 to 64; and 23.4% were 65 years of age or older. The gender makeup of the city was 47.1% male and 52.9% female.

Of the city's population over the age of 25, 51.1% hold a bachelor's degree or higher.

2000 census
As of the census of 2000, there were 7,307 people, 2,986 households, and 1,976 families living in the city. The population density was 1,649.7 people per square mile (636.9/km2). There were 3,141 housing units at an average density of 709.1 per square mile (273.8/km2). The racial makeup of the city was 88.81% White, 6.12% African American, 0.07% Native American, 3.30% Asian, 0.01% Pacific Islander, 0.44% from other races, and 1.26% from two or more races. Hispanic or Latino of any race were 1.08% of the population.

There were 2,986 households, out of which 27.0% had children under the age of 18 living with them, 56.2% were married couples living together, 8.1% had a female householder with no husband present, and 33.8% were non-families. 29.2% of all households were made up of individuals, and 12.1% had someone living alone who was 65 years of age or older. The average household size was 2.30 and the average family size was 2.85.

In the city the population was spread out, with 20.3% under the age of 18, 5.4% from 18 to 24, 26.0% from 25 to 44, 24.5% from 45 to 64, and 23.8% who were 65 years of age or older. The median age was 44 years. For every 100 females, there were 83.9 males. For every 100 females age 18 and over, there were 82.0 males.

The median income for a household in the city was $62,180, and the median income for a family was $78,947. Males had a median income of $56,303 versus $35,136 for females. The per capita income for the city was $34,927. About 0.6% of families and 1.5% of the population were below the poverty line, including 1.2% of those under age 18 and 1.5% of those age 65 or over.

Transportation and shopping 
Fairlawn is served by West Market Street, part of State Route 18. Market Street is a wide road with up to seven lanes. Fairlawn has a busy shopping district along the Route 18 corridor, to the extent where most areas have reached saturation. The area is anchored by Fairlawn Town Center, Summit Mall, Wal-Mart, Sam's Club, and other businesses and restaurants. The Montrose shopping district also includes neighboring Copley Township and Bath Township.

Fairlawn is also served by Interstate 77, which passes through the southern part of the city.

References

Further reading
 City of Fairlawn, Ohio (2003). Fairlawn, Ohio: Our History. Retrieved December 23, 2004.

External links
 City website

Cities in Summit County, Ohio
Populated places established in 1891
1891 establishments in Ohio
Cities in Ohio